The ruins of the Lichnice Castle (also: Lichtenburk Castle) are on the edge of the Iron Mountain near the village of Podhradí, in the municipality of Třemošnice, about  east of Čáslav.

History 
The castle was probably a constructed as a royal base in the first half of the 13th century. It was first mentioned in 1261, when it was in possession of Smil of Ronow, who called himself Smil of Lichtenburg and thereby created the von Lichtenburg family.

The castle had a triangular floor plan with two residential towers. In the 14th century alterations were made to the castle, which was reacquired by the Bohemian Crown in 1410. During the Hussite Wars, the castle was conquered in 1421, and besieged unsuccessfully in 1428.

In 1490, the castle and estate of Lichtenburg were acquired by the Trčka of Lípa family, who rebuilt the castle in a late Gothic style.

The castle lost its importance at the end of the 16th Century and the fortifications were dismantled. By 1700, it was already described as a ruin.

External links 

 Tourist information (in Czech)
 History of Lichnice (in Czech)

Castles in the Czech Republic
Chrudim District
Castles in the Pardubice Region
Ruined castles in the Czech Republic